The Cheshire Brine Subsidence Compensation Board was created by the Cheshire Brine Pumping (Compensation for Subsidence) Act 1952.

It pays compensation caused by any subsidence damage in Cheshire attributable to the practice of brine pumping.

See also
 Salt in Cheshire

External links
 Official website

Salt production
Organisations based in Cheshire